Kuhcher (also Romanized as Kūhcher; also known as Bonāy Hādy (Persian: بنائ هادئ) and Kachhor) is a village in Kuri Rural District, in the Central District of Jam County, Bushehr Province, Iran. At the 2006 census, its population was 212, in 46 families.

References 

Populated places in Jam County